Gustavo Madero may refer to:

 Gustavo A. Madero (1875–1913), participant in the Mexican Revolution against Porfirio Díaz
 Gustavo Madero Muñoz (born 1955), Mexican politician and businessman